Exo is a South Korean–Chinese boy band.

Exo or EXO may also refer to: 

 exo-, a medical prefix denotes something as "outside" another
 Exo (album), a 2012 album by Gatekeeper
 Exo (novel), a novel in the Jumper series by Steven Gould
 Exo (public transit), a regional public transit agency in greater Montreal, Canada
 Exo Inc., a company that makes protein bars using flour made from crickets
 Enriched Xenon Observatory (EXO), a particle physics experiment
 Exo, a 2017 novel by Fonda Lee
 The Exo Building, an office building in Dublin, Ireland.

See also 
 
 Ecto (disambiguation)
 Endo (disambiguation)
 XO (disambiguation)
 Exoplanet, a planet outside the Solar System
 Exoskeleton, an external skeleton that supports and protects an animal's body
 endo-exo isomerism, a characteristic of some organic compounds